Evaristo Nugkuag Ikanan (born 1950) is a Peruvian activist for environmental and indigenous people causes. He is a member of the Aguaruna people. He organized the Alliance of the Indian Peoples of the Peruvian Amazon (AIDESEP) and Coordinadora de las Organizaciones Indígenas de la Cuenca Amazónica "COICA" to serve indigenous people. In 1986, he was awarded the Right Livelihood Award for "organising to protect the rights of the Indians of the Amazon basin."

Awards 
1986 Right Livelihood Award
1991 Goldman Environmental Prize

References 

Indigenous activists of the Americas
Indigenous people of the Amazon
Peruvian environmentalists
1950 births
Living people
Goldman Environmental Prize awardees